Trillium lancifolium, the lanceleaf wakerobin, lance-leaved trillium, or narrow-leaved trillium, is a species of plants native to the southeastern United States. It is known to occur in Alabama, Florida, Georgia, Mississippi, South Carolina, and Tennessee. The species is imperiled in Alabama and Florida, and critically imperiled in South Carolina and Tennessee.

As implied by both scientific and common names, the (lanceolate) leaves are notably narrow, about 2.5 times as long as they are broad, with the widest portion being more-or-less central. The petals are usually maroon or brownish-maroon, quite erect, and more slender than in most other species of Trillium.

Trillium lancifolium blooms from February to May. It typically occurs in shady upland hardwood forests, but can be found in various other communities with some shade. Populations are usually scattered, and the individual plants are often present at low population levels.

Bibliography

References

External links

 
 Biodiversity Information Serving Our Nation (BISON) occurrence data and maps for Trillium lancifolium

lancifolium
Flora of the Southeastern United States
Flora of the Appalachian Mountains
Plants described in 1840
Taxa named by Constantine Samuel Rafinesque